Father Augustine Tolton Regional Catholic High School  is the first private, Roman Catholic high school in Columbia, Missouri, built in 2010.  It is  located in the Roman Catholic Diocese of Jefferson City.  The school is named after Missouri native Augustus Tolton, the first self-identified black Catholic priest in the United States. The school's enrollment for the 2017-18 school year was 285 students.

History 
Talk of opening a Catholic high school in Columbia had become a serious conversation by the time Bishop John R. Gaydos arrived in the Diocese Jefferson City in 1997. In a 2001 statement of his vision for the local Church, he called for “a study of how to expand the possibilities for Catholic secondary education in the diocese.” Feasibility studies indicated strong support among Catholic parishioners in Columbia and surrounding communities for opening a Catholic high school.

Local parishioners wanted the new high school to be built on a foundation of Catholic spirituality, college-prep academics, and leadership-development opportunities for students. They helped their parishes pay down construction debts, which allowed fund-raising for the new school to begin in earnest. The Diocese of Jefferson City provided $1.5 million in seed money through the “Grateful Memories … Faithful Future” capital campaign in 2006 and Bishop John Gaydos authorized the purchase of 23 acres of real estate.

A fund drive to raise an additional $5 million in pledges in 2009 allowed the executive committee to secure financing for the rest of the school's cost. Bishop Gaydos authorized initial site work and excavation for the school to begin in April of that year. The first classes started in August 2011 and the building opened in November 2011. 

Additional funds were being raised with the hope of keeping tuition affordable for as many children as possible. As of December 2019, however, the school held a debt of $6.2M, said to be related to the cost of constructing the school.

Campus
Tolton High School is located on the south side of Columbia off of U.S. Route 63 on East Gans Road. The campus sits adjacent to A. Perry Philips Park, an outdoor recreation area and lake.

Athletics
Tolton is a member of the Missouri State High School Activities Association (MSHSAA) which governs the athletics of most schools within Missouri. The school's teams are designated the "Trailblazers." Sponsored sports include baseball, golf (boys and girls), basketball (boys and girls), cheerleading, cross country (boys and girls), dance, football, soccer (boys and girls), softball, tennis (boys and girls), track (boys and girls), volleyball, and wrestling. In 2022, Tolton won the Missouri state class 3 high school baseball championship.

Notable alumni
 Michael Porter Jr., college basketball player for the Missouri Tigers, professional for the NBA team Denver Nuggets
 Jontay Porter, college basketball player for the Missouri Tigers, professional for the NBA team Memphis Grizzlies

References

External links

Roman Catholic Diocese of Jefferson City
High schools in Columbia, Missouri
Religion in Columbia, Missouri
Catholic secondary schools in Missouri
Educational institutions established in 2011
2011 establishments in Missouri